Louis Rabetrano (born 3 July 1954) is a Malagasy judoka. He competed in the men's lightweight event at the 1972 Summer Olympics.

References

1954 births
Living people
Malagasy male judoka
Olympic judoka of Madagascar
Judoka at the 1972 Summer Olympics
Place of birth missing (living people)